In nuclear engineering, prompt criticality describes a nuclear fission event in which criticality (the threshold for an exponentially growing nuclear fission chain reaction) is achieved with prompt neutrons alone (neutrons that are released immediately in a fission reaction) and does not rely on delayed neutrons (neutrons released in the subsequent decay of fission fragments).  As a result, prompt supercriticality causes a much more rapid growth in the rate of energy release than other forms of criticality.  Nuclear weapons are based on prompt criticality, while nuclear reactors rely on delayed neutrons or external neutrons to achieve criticality.

Criticality 
An assembly is critical if each fission event causes, on average, exactly one additional such event in a continual chain.  Such a chain is a self-sustaining fission chain reaction. When a uranium-235 (U-235) atom undergoes nuclear fission, it typically releases between one and seven neutrons (with an average of 2.4). In this situation, an assembly is critical if every released neutron has a 1/2.4 = 0.42 = 42 % probability of causing another fission event as opposed to either being absorbed by a non-fission capture event or escaping from the fissile core.

The average number of neutrons that cause new fission events is called the effective neutron multiplication factor, usually denoted by the symbols k-effective, k-eff or k. When k-effective is equal to 1, the assembly is called critical, if k-effective is less than 1 the assembly is said to be subcritical, and if k-effective is greater than 1 the assembly is called supercritical.

Critical versus prompt-critical 
In a supercritical assembly the number of fissions per unit time, N, along with the power production, increases exponentially with time.  How fast it grows depends on the average time it takes, T, for the neutrons released in a fission event to cause another fission.  The growth rate of the reaction is given by:

Most of the neutrons released by a fission event are the ones released in the fission itself.  These are called prompt neutrons, and strike other nuclei and cause additional fissions within nanoseconds (an average time interval used by scientists in the Manhattan Project was one shake, or 10 ns).  A small additional source of neutrons is the fission products.  Some of the nuclei resulting from the fission are radioactive isotopes with short half-lives, and nuclear reactions among them release additional neutrons after a long delay of up to several minutes after the initial fission event.  These neutrons, which on average account for less than one percent of the total neutrons released by fission, are called delayed neutrons. The relatively slow timescale on which delayed neutrons appear is an important aspect for the design of nuclear reactors, as it allows the reactor power level to be controlled via the gradual, mechanical movement of control rods. Typically, control rods contain neutron poisons (substances, for example boron or hafnium, that easily capture neutrons without producing any additional ones) as a means of altering k-effective. With the exception of experimental pulsed reactors, nuclear reactors are designed to operate in a delayed-critical mode and are provided with safety systems to prevent them from ever achieving prompt criticality.

In a delayed-critical assembly, the delayed neutrons are needed to make k-effective greater than one.  Thus the time between successive generations of the reaction, T, is dominated by the time it takes for the delayed neutrons to be released, of the order of seconds or minutes.  Therefore, the reaction will increase slowly, with a long time constant.  This is slow enough to allow the reaction to be controlled with electromechanical control systems such as control rods, and accordingly all nuclear reactors are designed to operate in the delayed-criticality regime.

In contrast, a critical assembly is said to be prompt-critical if it is critical (k = 1) without any contribution from delayed neutrons and prompt-supercritical if it is supercritical (the fission rate growing exponentially, k > 1) without any contribution from delayed neutrons.  In this case the time between successive generations of the reaction, T, is limited only by the fission rate from the prompt neutrons, and the increase in the reaction will be extremely rapid, causing a rapid release of energy within a few milliseconds.  Prompt-critical assemblies are created by design in nuclear weapons and some specially designed research experiments.

The difference between a prompt neutron and a delayed neutron has to do with the source from which the neutron has been released into the reactor. The neutrons, once released, have no difference except the energy or speed that have been imparted to them. A nuclear weapon relies heavily on prompt-supercriticality (to produce a high peak power in a fraction of a second), whereas nuclear power reactors use delayed-criticality to produce controllable power levels for months or years.

Nuclear reactors 
In order to start up a controllable fission reaction, the assembly must be delayed-critical. In other words, k must be greater than 1 (supercritical) without crossing the prompt-critical threshold. In nuclear reactors this is possible due to delayed neutrons. Because it takes some time before these neutrons are emitted following a fission event, it is possible to control the nuclear reaction using control rods.

A steady-state (constant power) reactor is operated so that it is critical due to the delayed neutrons, but would not be so without their contribution. During a gradual and deliberate increase in reactor power level, the reactor is delayed-supercritical. The exponential increase of reactor activity is slow enough to make it possible to control the criticality factor, k, by inserting or withdrawing rods of neutron absorbing material. Using careful control rod movements, it is thus possible to achieve a supercritical reactor core without reaching an unsafe prompt-critical state.

Once a reactor plant is operating at its target or design power level, it can be operated to maintain its critical condition for long periods of time.

Prompt critical accidents 

Nuclear reactors can be susceptible to prompt-criticality accidents if a large increase in reactivity (or k-effective) occurs, e.g., following failure of their control and safety systems. The rapid uncontrollable increase in reactor power in prompt-critical conditions is likely to irreparably damage the reactor and in extreme cases, may breach the containment of the reactor. Nuclear reactors' safety systems are designed to prevent prompt criticality and, for defense in depth, reactor structures also provide multiple layers of containment as a precaution against any accidental releases of radioactive fission products.

With the exception of research and experimental reactors, only a small number of reactor accidents are thought to have achieved prompt criticality, for example Chernobyl #4, the U.S. Army's SL-1, and Soviet submarine K-431. In all these examples the uncontrolled surge in power was sufficient to cause an explosion that destroyed each reactor and released radioactive fission products into the atmosphere.

At Chernobyl in 1986, a poorly understood positive scram effect resulted in an overheated reactor core. This led to the rupturing of the fuel elements and water pipes, vaporization of water, a steam explosion, and a meltdown. Estimated power levels prior to the incident suggest that it operated in excess of 30 GW, ten times its 3 GW maximum thermal output. The reactor chamber's 2000-ton lid was lifted by the steam explosion. Since the reactor was not designed with a containment building capable of containing this catastrophic explosion, the accident released large amounts of radioactive material into the environment. 

In the other two incidents, the reactor plants failed due to errors during a maintenance shutdown that was caused by the rapid and uncontrolled removal of at least one control rod. The SL-1 was a prototype reactor intended for use by the US Army in remote polar locations. At the SL-1 plant in 1961, the reactor was brought from shutdown to prompt critical state by manually extracting the central control rod too far. As the water in the core quickly converted to steam and expanded (in just a few milliseconds), the  reactor vessel jumped , leaving impressions in the ceiling above. All three men performing the maintenance procedure died from injuries. 1,100 curies of fission products were released as parts of the core were expelled. It took 2 years to investigate the accident and clean up the site. The excess prompt reactivity of the SL-1 core was calculated in a 1962 report:

In the K-431 reactor accident, 10 were killed during a refueling operation. The K-431 explosion destroyed the adjacent machinery rooms and ruptured the submarine's hull. In these two catastrophes, the reactor plants went from complete shutdown to extremely high power levels in a fraction of a second, damaging the reactor plants beyond repair.

List of accidental prompt critical excursions
A number of research reactors and tests have purposely examined the operation of a prompt critical reactor plant. CRAC, KEWB, SPERT-I, Godiva device, and BORAX experiments contributed to this research. Many accidents have also occurred, however, primarily during research and processing of nuclear fuel. SL-1 is the notable exception.

The following list of prompt critical power excursions is adapted from a report submitted in 2000 by a team of American and Russian nuclear scientists who studied criticality accidents, published by the Los Alamos Scientific Laboratory, the location of many of the excursions. A typical power excursion is about 1 x 1017 fissions.
Los Alamos Scientific Laboratory, 21 August 1945
Los Alamos Scientific Laboratory, 21 May 1946
Los Alamos Scientific Laboratory, December 1949, 3 or 4 x 1016 fissions
Los Alamos Scientific Laboratory, 1 February 1951
Los Alamos Scientific Laboratory, 18 April 1952
Argonne National Laboratory, 2 June 1952
Oak Ridge National Laboratory, 26 May 1954
Oak Ridge National Laboratory, 1 February 1956
Los Alamos Scientific Laboratory, 3 July 1956
Los Alamos Scientific Laboratory, 12 February 1957
Mayak Production Association, 2 January 1958
Oak Ridge Y-12 Plant, 16 June 1958 (possible)
Los Alamos Scientific Laboratory, Cecil Kelley criticality accident, 30 December 1958
SL-1, 3 January 1961, 4 x 1018 fissions or 
Idaho Chemical Processing Plant, 25 January 1961
Los Alamos Scientific Laboratory, 11 December 1962
Sarov (Arzamas-16), 11 March 1963
White Sands Missile Range, 28 May 1965
Oak Ridge National Laboratory, 30 January 1968
Chelyabinsk-70, 5 April 1968
Aberdeen Proving Ground, 6 September 1968
Mayak Production Association, 10 December 1968 (2 prompt critical excursions)
Kurchatov Institute, 15 February 1971
Idaho Chemical Processing Plant, 17 October 1978 (very nearly prompt critical)
Soviet submarine K-431, 10 August 1985
Chernobyl disaster, 26 April 1986
Sarov (Arzamas-16), 17 June 1997
JCO Fuel Fabrication Plant, 30 September 1999

Nuclear weapons 

In the design of nuclear weapons, in contrast, achieving prompt criticality is essential. Indeed, one of the design problems to overcome in constructing a bomb is to compress the fissile materials enough to achieve prompt criticality before the chain reaction has a chance to produce enough energy to cause the core to expand too much.  A good bomb design must therefore win the race to a dense, prompt critical core before a less-powerful chain reaction disassembles the core without allowing a significant amount of fuel to fission (known as a fizzle). This generally means that nuclear bombs need special attention paid to the way the core is assembled, such as the implosion method invented by Richard C. Tolman, Robert Serber, and other scientists at the University of California, Berkeley in 1942.

See also
Subcritical reactor
Thermal neutron
Void coefficient

References and links 

 "Nuclear Energy: Principles", Physics Department, Faculty of Science, Mansoura University, Mansoura, Egypt; apparently excerpted from notes from the University of Washington Department of Mechanical Engineering; themselves apparently summarized from Bodansky, D. (1996), Nuclear Energy: Principles, Practices, and Prospects, AIP
 DOE Fundamentals Handbook

Nuclear technology
Prompt critical
Nuclear weapon design

de:Kritikalität
es:Casi crítico
ko:임계
ja:臨界状態